Glasman is a surname. Notable people with the surname include:
Baruch Glasman (1893-1945), Yiddish novelist, short story writer, and essayist
Maurice Glasman, Baron Glasman (born 1961), English academic and peer
Yaakov Glasman, rabbi and communal leader

See also
Glassman
 Glazman